Madely may refer to:
 Madeły, village in Poland

People with the name
 Madely Beaugendre (born 1965), French athlete
 Steve Madely, Canadian radio host

See also
 Madeley (disambiguation)